German submarine U-296 was a Type VIIC/41 U-boat of Nazi Germany's Kriegsmarine during World War II.

She was laid down on 23 January 1943 by the Bremer Vulkan Werft (yard) at Bremen-Vegesack as yard number 61, launched on 5 September 1943 and commissioned on 3 November with Oberleutnant zur See Karl-Heinz Rasch in command.

In three patrols, she did not sink or damage any ships.

She was regarded as missing with all hands (42 men), in the approaches to the North Channel, (between Northern Ireland and mainland Great Britain), in March 1945.

Design
German Type VIIC/41 submarines were preceded by the shorter Type VIIB submarines. U-296 had a displacement of  when at the surface and  while submerged. She had two shafts and two  propellers.

U-296 was fitted with five  torpedo tubes (four fitted at the bow and one at the stern), fourteen torpedoes, one  SK C/35 naval gun, (220 rounds), one  Flak M42 and two  C/30 anti-aircraft guns. The boat had a complement of between forty-four and sixty.

Service history

The boat's service life began with training with the 8th U-boat Flotilla in November 1943. She was then transferred to the 9th flotilla for operations on 1 August 1944. She was reassigned to the 11th flotilla on 1 October.

She made the short journey from Kiel in Germany to Horten Naval Base in Norway, arriving on 31 July 1944 and moving on to Bergen on 6 August.

First patrol
U-296s first patrol between Bergen and Trondheim, took her through the 'gap' between the Shetland and Faroe Islands, both outbound and inbound.

Second patrol
The boat's second sortie was similar to her first; starting in Trondheim and terminating in Stavanger. She reached northern Scotland, but this time she passed between Iceland and the Faroe Islands.

Third patrol and fate
Having left Bergen in late February 1945, she was listed as missing on 12 March in the North Channel, a possible victim of a mine.

Previously recorded fate
U-296 was originally thought to have been sunk by a torpedo from a British B-24 Liberator of No. 120 Squadron RAF. This attack was actually against a non-submarine target.

See also
 Battle of the Atlantic (1939-1945)

References

Bibliography

External links

German Type VIIC/41 submarines
U-boats commissioned in 1943
1943 ships
World War II submarines of Germany
Ships built in Bremen (state)
Ships lost with all hands
U-boats sunk by mines
Maritime incidents in March 1945